Kate Bassett (born 11 February 1967) is a British journalist who writes for The Times newspaper as a theatre critic.

She was educated at the Hertfordshire and Essex High School, won a Bernard Sunley Scholarship to Westminster School in London, before reading English Literature at Corpus Christi College, Cambridge, on a Manners Scholarship.

She worked as the theatre critic for the Independent on Sunday from 2000 to September 2013 and, prior to that, as a theatre critic for the Daily Telegraph (from 1996) and The Times (1993 to 1996), and as deputy theatre editor of City Limits. Her features and reviews have also covered comedy, dance, books, film and opera, with further publications including Time Out, the New Statesman, The Times Literary Supplement, The Guardian, and the Literary Review. She has featured on BBC Radio's Night Waves and On Air, and BBC London 94.9.

She has twice chaired the Perrier Comedy Awards (now the Edinburgh Comedy Awards) and been a judge on the  Susan Smith Blackburn Prize, Equity's Clarence Derwent Awards, the Verity Bargate Award for emerging playwrights, the TMA Theatre Awards, the Peter Brook Empty Space Awards, the European Theatre Convention Awards, the Hackney Empire New Act of the Year Awards, Channel 4's So You Think You're Funny Awards, and the literary David Cohen Prize. She hosts and takes part in platform talks at the National Theatre and elsewhere.

Her book In Two Minds: A Biography of Jonathan Miller (2012) was favourably reviewed. In 2013, it was shortlisted for the Sheridan Morley Prize for Theatre Biography; the Theatre Book Prize (Society for Theatre Research); and the 2013 HW Fisher Best First Biography Prize.

It emerged at the end of July 2013 that Bassett was soon to leave The Independent on Sunday, as the newspaper was reducing its arts coverage. The paper made its established team of arts reviewers redundant on 1 September 2013, a fact that provoked much media comment.

In September 2014, she was appointed as an associate professor of Creative Writing in the Department of English Literature at Reading University. She also works as a script consultant and dramaturg for theatre and film companies, and Literary Associate at Chichester Festival Theatre.

References

1967 births
Living people
Academics of the University of Reading
British journalists
British theatre critics